Ensemble average is a mean in statistical mechanics.

Ensemble average or ensemble averaging may also refer to:

 Ensemble averaging (machine learning)
 Process ensemble average, usage in econometrics and signal processing
 Ensemble (fluid mechanics), usage in fluid mechanics
 Ensemble forecasting, usage in weather forecasting
 Climate ensemble, usage in climatology

See also
 Ensemble (disambiguation)
 Ensemble coding, a theory in cognitive neuroscience involving an average
 Replication (statistics)
 Resampling (statistics)
 Monte Carlo methods